Hamad bin Khalid bin Abdullah bin Jassim Al Thani (1952 – 13 September 2012) was a Qatari entrepreneur and Chief of the Qatari police forces. He was a member of the House of Thani and cousin of the former Emir of Qatar, Hamad bin Khalifa Al Thani.

Early life and education
Hamad Al Thani was born in 1952 at the Al Rayyan Palace in Doha, Qatar. He is the eldest child of Sheikh Khalid bin Hamad bin Abdullah Al Thani and Sheikha Mariam. After a coup, his uncle Emir Khalifa bin Hamad Al Thani became the 8th Emir of Qatar, and appointed his father as the minister of interior in 1972, where he remained until 1989. Through his father, Hamad Al Thani is also a great-grandson of the 3rd Emir of Qatar, Abdullah bin Jassim Al Thani, and a first cousin of the former and 9th Emir, Hamad bin Khalifa Al Thani.

Hamad Al Thani began his education in Qatar and later attended Sandhurst Military Academy in England.

Career
Hamad Al Thani was deputy commander of the Qatar armed forces from 1973 to 1978. In 1978 he became the chief of the Qatari police forces, where he remained until 1988.

He founded in 1973, and is owner of, the company Hamad Bin Khalid Power Cleaning (HBK Power Cleaning W.L.L). Hamad Al Thani also established construction company with his business partner named HKH General Contracting W.L.L in 1995.

HKH General Contractors is now referred to as HKH Contracting and has gone on to be a big player in the market after its management was largely controlled by Sheikh Hamad's son, Sheikh Abdulrahman bin Hamad Al Thani.

Personal life
Sheikh Hamad was the eldest son of Sheikh Khalid bin Hamad bin Abdullah Al Thani and was married and had four sons and six daughters. Sheikh Hamad had lung cancer and died in 2012; he was buried in the Sheikhs' graveyard opposite to his fathers palace in Al Rayyan district of Doha.

References

1952 births
2012 deaths
Hamad bin Khalid bin Hamad bin Abdullah Al Thani
Graduates of the Royal Military Academy Sandhurst